Mukane or Mukne is a large village in Igatpuri Tehsil in Nashik district of Maharashtra, India. Mukane village is administered by Sarpanch (Head of Village).

References 

Villages in Nashik district